The 2006 Scottish Cup Final was played on 13 May 2006 at Hampden Park in Glasgow and was the final of the 120th Scottish Cup. The final was contested by Heart of Midlothian (Hearts), who beat Hibernian 4–0 in the semi-final, and Gretna, who beat Dundee 3–0.

Hearts had previously reached the final 13 times, winning six. Gretna, who were only admitted to the Scottish Football League in 2002, having previously competed in non-League English football, had never reached the final. Gretna became the first team from the third tier of Scottish football to reach a Scottish Cup Final.

The cup holders were Celtic, who had beaten Dundee United 1–0  to win the previous final, but they were knocked out in the third round by First Division club Clyde who beat them 2–1.

Hearts won the match 4–2 on penalties after the match had ended in a 1–1 draw after extra time.

Match details

Road to the final

References

2006
Heart of Midlothian F.C. matches
Gretna F.C. matches
Cup Final
Association football penalty shoot-outs
2000s in Glasgow
May 2006 sports events in the United Kingdom